Dance and Sing! The Best of Nick Jr. is an album released in 2001 on CD and cassette from Kid Rhino. The CD includes songs from some of the most popular Nick Jr. programs, including Face, Nick Jr. Sings, Dora the Explorer, Little Bill, Little Bear, Blue's Clues, Gullah Gullah Island, Oswald, Maggie and the Ferocious Beast, Franklin, Maisy, and Kipper. The album was scored by Tanner "Bones" Jones. The album charted at No. 16 on the Billboard Top Kid Audio chart.

Tracks
The CD has 44 tracks which included:

References

External links
 Dance & Sing: The Best of Nick Jr. on AllMusic

2001 compilation albums
Kid Rhino albums